Thomas White (1 August 1893 – 1927) was an English professional rugby league footballer who played in the 1910s and 1920s.

Background
Tom White was born in Prescot, Lancashire, England, he was the manager of the St. Helens branch of Messrs. W & T Avery Ltd.'s Weights and Measures, he died aged 33 at home on Crab Street, St. Helens of a heart attack following an attempt to kick start his motorbike outside W & T Avery Ltd. on Claughton Street, St. Helens, Lancashire, England.

Playing career

Challenge Cup Final appearances
Tom White played left-, i.e. number 4, in St. Helens' 3-37 defeat by Huddersfield in the 1915 Challenge Cup Final during the 1914–15 season at Watersheddings, Oldham on Saturday 1 May 1915, in front of a crowd of 8,000.

References

External links
Search for "Thomas White" at britishnewspaperarchive.co.uk
Search for "Tom White" at britishnewspaperarchive.co.uk

1893 births
1927 deaths
English rugby league players
Rugby league centres
Rugby league five-eighths
Rugby league halfbacks
Rugby league players from Prescot
Rugby league wingers
St Helens R.F.C. players